This is a list of schools in France

 Lycée Saint-Louis-de-Gonzague, Paris
 École Canadienne Bilingue de Paris
 Notre-Dame International High School, Verneuil-sur-Seine
 L’Ensemble Scolaire Maurice-Tièche, Collonges-sous-Salève
 Lycée Thiers, Marseille
 La Martiniere Lyon, Lyon
 Lycée International de Saint Germain-en-Laye, Saint-Germain-en-Laye
 Lycée Louis-le-Grand, Paris
 International School of Lyon (ISL), Lyon
 Sarina Dorie
 Lycée Janson de Sailly, Paris
 Lycée La Fontaine (Paris)
 Cité Scolaire Internationale de Lyon (know also as the CSI or Lycée International de Lyon)
 Lycée Galilée, Franqueville-Saint-Pierre
 Collège Lycée International Cévenol, Le Chambon-sur-Lignon
 Chavagnes International College, Chavagnes-en-Paillers
 Collège Lycée International, Ferney-Voltaire
 Institution Sainte-Marie, La Seyne-sur-Mer
Lycée Adolphe Cherioux, Vitry-sur-Seine
Lycée Alain, Le Vésinet
Lycée Alain Borne, Montélimar
Lycée Alain Chartier, Bayeux
Lycée Alain René Lesage, Vannes
Lycée Alain-Fournier, Bourges
, Nice 
Lycée Albert Camus, Bois-Colombes
Lycée Albert Camus, Nantes
Lycée Albert Camus, Rillieux-la-Pape
Lycée Albert Camus, Firminy
Lycée Albert Châtelet, Douai
Lycée Albert Châtelet, Saint-Pol-sur-Ternoise
Lycée Albert Einstein, Sainte-Geneviève-des-Bois
Lycée Albert Schweitzer, Le Raincy
Lycée Albert Schweitzer, Mulhouse
Lycée Albert Thomas, Roanne
Lycée Albert Triboulet, Romans-sur-Isère
Lycée Alexandra David Neel, Digne-les-Bains
Lycée Alexandre Ribot, Saint-Omer
Lycée Alexis de Tocqueville, Cherbourg-Octeville
Lycée Alfred de Vigny, Loches
Lycée Alfred Kastler, Cergy
Lycée Alfred Kastler, Denain
Lycée Alfred Kastler, Talence
Lycée Alfred Kastler, Guebwiller
Lycée Alfred Mézières, Longwy
Lycée Aliénor D'Aquitaine, Poitiers
Lycée Alphonse Daudet, Nîmes
Lycée Alphonse Daudet, Tarascon
Lycée Alphonse-Benoît, L'Isle-sur-la-Sorgue
Lycée Ambroise Brugière, Clermont-Ferrand
Lycée Ambroise Paré, Laval
Lycée Amédé Gasquet, Clermont-Ferrand
Lycée Amiral de Grasse, Grasse
Lycée Amiral Ronarc'H, Brest
Lycée Ampère-Bourse, Lyon
Lycée Anatole France, Lillers
Lycée André Argouges, Grenoble
Lycée Andre Boulloche, Livry-Gargan
Lycée André Lurçat, Maubeuge
Lycée André Malraux, Remiremont
Lycée André Malraux, Béthune
Lycée André Malraux, Montereau-Fault-Yonne
Lycée André Maurois, Elbeuf
Lycée André Maurois, Deauville
Lycée Antoine Bourdelle, Montauban
Lycée Antoine de Saint-Exupéry, Saint-Raphaël
Lycée Antoine de Saint-Exupéry, Fameck
Lycée Antonin Artaud, Marseille
Lycée Arago, Paris
Lycée Arcisse de Caumont, Bayeux
Lycée Aristide Bergès, Seyssinet-Pariset
Lycée Aristide Briand, Évreux
Lycée Aristide Briand, Saint-Nazaire
Lycée Aristide Briand, Gap
Lycée Arthur Rimbaud, Istres
Lycée Arthur Rimbaud, Sin-le-Noble
Lycée Arthur Varoquaux, Tomblaine
Lycée Atlantique, Luçon
Lycée Auguste Angellier, Dunkirk
Lycée Auguste Behal, Lens
Lycée Auguste et Louis Lumière, La Ciotat
Lycée Auguste Pavie, Guingamp
Lycée Auguste Renoir, Cagnes-sur-Mer
Lycée Auguste Renoir, Limoges
Lycée Auguste Renoir, Asnières-sur-Seine
Lycée Augustin Fresnel, Caen
Lycée Augustin Fresnel, Bernay
Lycée Augustin Thierry, Blois
Lycée Balzac, Tours
Lycée Banville, Moulins
Lycée Bartholdi, Colmar
Lycée Baudelaire, Roubaix
Lycée Baudimont, Arras
Lycée Beau Site, Nice
Lycée Beauregard, Montbrison
Lycée Beaussier, La Seyne-sur-Mer
Lycée Bellevue, Le Mans
Lycée Bellevue, Toulouse
Lycée Bellevue, Saintes
Lycée Benjamin Franklin, Orléans
Lycée Benjamin Franklin, Auray
Lycée Bernard Palissy, Saintes
Lycée Bernard Palissy, Agen
Lycée Bernard Palissy - Ancien "Lycée Mixte", Gien
Lycée Berthollet, Annecy
Lycée Bertran de Born, Périgueux
Lycée Bertrand D'Argentré, Vitré
Lycée Blaise Pascal, Clermont-Ferrand
Lycée Blaise Pascal, Orsay
Lycée Blaise Pascal, Rouen
Lycée Blaise Pascal, Forbach
Lycée Blaise Pascal, Châteauroux
Lycée Blaise Pascal, Segré
Lycée Blaise Pascal, Colmar
Lycée Blaise Pascal, Brie-Comte-Robert
Lycée Blaise Pascal Cité Scolaire, Longuenesse
Lycée Bonaparte, Toulon
Lycée Bonaparte Site Bonaparte, Autun
Lycée Borde Basse, Castres
Lycée Boucher de Perthes, Abbeville
Lycée Bristol, Cannes
Lycée Brizeux, uimper
Lycée Buffon, Paris
Lycée C F Lebrun, Coutances
Lycée Camille Claudel, Digoin
Lycée Camille Claudel, Vauréal
Lycée Camille Claudel, Fourmies
Lycée Camille Claudel, Blois
Lycée Camille Desmoulins, Le Cateau-Cambrésis
Lycée Camille Guérin, Poitiers
Lycée Camille Jullian, Bordeaux
Lycée Camille Pissarro, Pontoise
Lycée Camille Saint-Saëns, Rouen
Lycée Camille Sée, Paris
Lycée Camille Vernet, Valence
Lycée Carcouet, Nantes
Lycée Carnot, Dijon
Lycée Carnot, Bruay-la-Buissière
Lycée Carnot, Cannes
Lycée Carnot, Paris
Lycée Cassini, Clermont
Lycée Champlain, Chennevières-sur-Marne
Lycée Champollion, Grenoble
Lycée Champollion, Figeac
Lycée Chanzy, Charleville-Mézières
Lycée Chaptal, Paris
Lycée Chaptal, Quimper
Lycée Chaptal, Mende
Lycée Charlemagne, Thionville
Lycée Charlemagne, Paris
Lycée Charles de Coulomb, Angoulême
Lycée Charles de Foucauld, Brest
Lycée Charles de Gaulle, Longperrier

Lycée Charles Despiau, Mont-de-Marsan
Lycée Charles Deulin, Condé-sur-l'Escaut
Lycée Charles Hermite, Dieuze
Lycée Charles Jully, Saint-Avold
Lycée Charles Le Chauve, Roissy-en-Brie
Lycée Charles Poncet, Cluses
Lycée Charles Renouvier, Prades
Lycée Charlie Chaplin, Décines-Charpieu
Lycée Chevrollier, Angers
Lycée Choiseul, Tours
Lycée Chrestien de Troyes, Troyes
Lycée Claude Bernard, Villefranche-sur-Saône
Lycée Claude Bernard, Paris
Lycée Claude de France, Romorantin-Lanthenay
Lycée Claude Debussy, Saint-Germain-en-Laye
Lycée Claude et Pierre Virlogeux, Riom
Lycée Claude Fauriel, Saint-Étienne
Lycée Claude Gellée, Épinal
Lycée Claude Lebois, Saint-Chamond
Lycée Claude Monet, Le Havre
Lycée Claude Monet, Paris
Lycée Clémenceau, Nantes
Lycée Clémenceau, Reims
Lycée Clémenceau, Montpellier
Lycée Clément Marot, Cahors
Lycée Climatique d'Altitude, Briançon
Lycée Clos Banet, Perpignan
Lycée Clos Maire, Beaune
Lycée Colbert, Lorient
Lycée Colbert, Lyon
Lycée Colbert, Tourcoing
Lycée Colbert, Paris
Lycée Colbert de Torcy, Sablé-sur-Sarthe
Lycée Condorcet, Lens
Lycée Condorcet, Saint-Quentin
Lycée Condorcet, Paris
Lycée Condorcet, Belfort
Lycée Condorcet, Méru
Lycée Condorcet, Limay
Lycée Cordouan, Royan
Lycée Corneille, Rouen
Lycée Cornouaille, Quimper
Lycée Courbet, Belfort
Lycée Curie, Vire
Lycée D' Estour. de Constant, La Flèche
Lycée D'Arsonval, Brive-la-Gaillarde
Lycée D'Arsonval, Saint-Maur-des-Fossés
Lycée D'Artois, Nœux-les-Mines
Lycée D'Avesnières, Laval
Lycée D'Enseignement Général et Technologique La Fayette, Clermont-Ferrand
Lycée D'Enseignement Général et Technologique Paul Constans, Montluçon
Lycée D'Hôtellerie et de Tourisme de Gascogne, Talence
Lycée Darius Milhaud, Le Kremlin-Bicêtre
Lycée David D'Angers, Angers
Lycée de Bagatelle, Saint-Gaudens
Lycée de Borda, Dax
Lycée de Corbeil, Corbeil-Essonnes
Lycée de Grand Air, Arcachon
Lycée de l'Arc, Orange
Lycée de l'Edit, Roussillon
Lycée de l'Elorn, Landerneau
Lycée de l'Empéri, Salon-de-Provence
Lycée de l'Escaut, Valenciennes
Lycée de l'Europe, Dunkirk
Lycée de l'Image et du Son, Angoulême
Lycée de l'Iroise, Brest
Lycée de la Camargue, Nîmes
Lycée de la Communication, Metz
Lycée de la Plaine de l'Ain, Ambérieu-en-Bugey
Lycée de la Plaine de Neauphle, Trappes
Lycée de la Vallée de Chevreuse, Gif-sur-Yvette
Lycée de la Vallée du Cailly, Déville-lès-Rouen
Lycée de la Venise Verte, Niort
Lycée de Montgeron, Montgeron
Lycée de Presles, Cusset
Lycée de Sèvres, Sèvres
Lycée de Val de Murigny, Reims
Lycée Delamare Deboutteville, Forges-les-Eaux
Lycée Denis Diderot, Carvin
Lycée Denis Diderot, Marseille
Lycée Déodat de Severac, Céret
Lycée Déodat de Séverac, Toulouse
Lycée des 7 Mares, Maurepas
Lycée des Bourdonnières, Nantes
Lycée des Eaux Claires, Grenoble
Lycée des Eucalyptus, Nice
Lycée des Flandres, Hazebrouck
Lycée des Glières, Annemasse
Lycée Descartes, Tours
Lycée Descartes, Antony
Lycée Descartes, Montigny-le-Bretonneux
Lycée Descartes, Rabat
Lycée Diderot, Paris
Lycée Diderot, Narbonne
Lycée Diderot, Langres
Lycée Docteur Gustave Jaume, Pierrelatte
Lycée Docteur Koeberlé, Sélestat
Lycée Docteur Lacroix, Narbonne
Lycée Dominique Villars, Gap
Lycée Don Bosco, Nice
Lycée Dorian, Paris
Lycée Douanier Rousseau, Laval
Lycée du Bois D'Amour, Poitiers
Lycée du Bugey, Belley
Lycée du Canada, Évreux
Lycée du Castella, Pamiers
Lycée du Dauphiné, Romans-sur-Isère
Lycée du Golf, Dieppe
Lycée du Granier, La Ravoire
Lycée du Grésivaudan, Meylan
Lycée du Noordover, Grande-Synthe
Lycée du Parc de Vilgénis, Massy
Lycée du Parc Impérial, Nice
Lycée du Sacré Coeur, Tourcoing
Lycée du Sacré Coeur, Aix-en-Provence
Lycée du Sacré Coeur, Saint-Maur-des-Fossés
Lycée du Sacré-Coeur, Amiens
Lycée du Val de Saône, Trévoux
Lycée du Vimeu, Friville-Escarbotin
Lycée Duhamel du Monceau, Pithiviers
Lycée Dumont D'Urville, Toulon
Lycée Dumont D'Urville, Caen
Lycée Dupleix, Landrecies
Lycée Duplessis Mornay, Saumur
Lycée Dupuy de Lome, Lorient
Lycée E Bouchardon, Chaumont
Lycée E Freyssinet, Saint Brieuc
Lycée Edgar Quinet, Bourg-en-Bresse
Lycée Edgar Quinet, Paris
Lycée Edmond Perrier, Tulle
Lycée Édouard Belin, Vesoul
Lycée Édouard Branly, Boulogne-sur-Mer
Lycée Édouard Branly, Nogent-sur-Marne
Lycée Édouard Branly, Châtellerault
Lycée Édouard Branly, Amiens
Lycée Édouard Branly, Lyon
Lycée Édouard Branly, Dreux
Lycée Édouard Gand, Amiens
Lycée Édouard Herriot, Voiron
Lycée Édouard Herriot, Lyon
Lycée Édouard Herriot, Sainte-Savine
Lycée Édouard Vaillant, Vierzon
Lycée Élie Cartan, La Tour-du-Pin
Lycée Émile Combes, Pons
Lycée Émile Duclaux, Aurillac
Lycée Émile Littré, Avranches
Lycée Émile Loubet, Valence
Lycée Émile Zola, Aix-en-Provence
Lycée Émile Zola, Rennes
Lycée Émile Zola, Châteaudun
Lycée Émile Zola, Wattrelos
Lycée Emilie de Breteuil, Montigny-le-Bretonneux
Lycée Emmanuel D'Alzon, Nîmes
Lycée Emmanuel Mounier, Grenoble
Lycée Emmanuel Mounier, Châtenay-Malabry
Lycée Enseignement Général et Technologique Voltaire, Orléans
Lycée Ernest Bichat, Lunéville
Lycée Ernest Couteaux, Saint-Amand-les-Eaux
Lycée Ernest Pérochon, Parthenay
Lycée Ernest Renan, Saint-Brieuc
Lycée Estienne D'Orves, Nice
Lycée et Lycee Professionnel Bellevue, Toulouse
Lycée et Lycée Professionnel Raymond Queneau, Yvetot
Lycée Étienne Bezout, Nemours
Lycée Eugène Delacroix, Maisons-Alfort
Lycée Eugène Delacroix, Drancy
Lycée Eugène Thomas, Le Quesnoy
Lycée Europe Robert Schuman, Cholet
Lycée Evariste Galois (Sartrouville)
Lycée Evariste Galois (Beaumont-sur-Oise)
Lycée Fabert, Metz
Lycée Faidherbe, Lille
Lycée Félix Esclangon, Manosque
Lycée Félix Faure, Beauvais
Lycée Félix Le Dantec, Lannion
Lycée Félix Mayer, Creutzwald
Lycée Fénelon, Cambrai
Lycée Fénelon, Lille
Lycée Fénelon, Paris
Lycée Ferdinand Buisson, Elbeuf
Lycée Ferdinand Foch, Rodez
Lycée Fernand Daguin, Mérignac
Lycée Fernand Darchicourt, Hénin-Beaumont
Lycée Fernand Renaudeau, Cholet
Lycée Flora Tristan, Noisy-le-Grand
Lycée Florent Schmitt, Saint Cloud
Lycée Fragonard, L'Isle-Adam
Lycée Francisque Sarcey, Dourdan
Lycée François Ier, Vitry-le-François
Lycée François Ier, Le Havre
Lycée François Arago, Perpignan
Lycée François Bazin, Charleville-Mézières
Lycée François Couperin, Fontainebleau
Lycée François Ier, Fontainebleau
Lycée François Joseph Talma, Brunoy
Lycée François Magendie, Bordeaux
Lycée François Mauriac, Bordeaux
Lycée François Mauriac - Forez, Andrézieux-Bouthéon
Lycée François Rabelais, Fontenay-le-Comte
Lycée François Truffaut, Beauvais
Lycée François Truffaut, Bondoufle
Lycée François Villon, Les Mureaux
Lycée François Villon, Paris
Lycée Frédéric Chopin, Nancy
Lycée Frédéric et Irène Joliot Curie, Nanterre
Lycée Frédéric Faÿs, Villeurbanne
Lycée Frédéric Joliot- Curie, Aubagne
Lycée Fréderic Mistral, Fresnes
Lycée Frédéric Mistral, Avignon
Lycée Fulbert, Chartres
Lycée Fustel de Coulanges, Massy
Lycée Fustel de Coulanges, Strasbourg
Lycée Gabriel Fauré, Annecy
Lycée Gabriel Fauré, Foix
Lycée Gabriel Fauré, Paris
Lycée Gabriel Guist'Hau, Nantes
Lycée Gabriel Touchard, Le Mans
Lycée Galilee, Combs-la-Ville
Lycée Galilée, Cergy
Lycée Galilée, Franqueville-Saint-Pierre
Lycée Gambetta, Tourcoing
Lycée Gambetta, Arras
Lycée Gaston Bachelard, Chelles
Lycée Gaston Berger, Lille
Lycée Gay Lussac, Chauny
Lycée Gay Lussac, Limoges
Lycée Général et Technologique Louis Pasquet, Arles
Lycée Geoffroy Saint-Hilaire, Étampes
Lycée George Sand, Cosne-Cours-sur-Loire
Lycée George Sand, Le Mée-sur-Seine
Lycée Georges Braque, Argenteuil
Lycée Georges Brassens (Villeneuve-le-Roi)
Lycée Georges Brassens (Évry, Essonne)
Lycée Georges Brassens (Rive-de-Gier)
Lycée Georges Brassens (Neufchâtel-en-Bray)
Lycée Georges Cabanis, Brive-la-Gaillarde
Lycée Georges Clemenceau, Villemomble
Lycée Georges Cuvier, Montbéliard
Lycée Georges de La Tour, Metz
Lycée Georges de La Tour, Nancy
Lycée Georges Dumézil, Vernon
Lycée Gérard de Nerval, Soissons
Lycée Gérard de Nerval, Luzarches
Lycée Gérard Philipe, Bagnols-sur-Cèze
Lycée Giocante de Casabianca, Bastia
Lycée Godart Roger, Épernay
Lycée Grand Air, La Baule-Escoublac
Lycée Grandmont, Tours
Lycée Guez de Balzac, Angoulême
Lycée Guillaume Apollinaire (Thiais)
Lycée Guillaume Apollinaire (Nice)
Lycée Guillaume Budé, Limeil-Brévannes
Lycée Guillaume Fichet, Bonneville
Lycée Guillaume Le Conquérant, Lillebonne
Lycée Gustave Eiffel, Bordeaux
Lycée Gustave Eiffel, Dijon
Lycée Gustave Eiffel, Gagny
Lycée Gustave Eiffel, Cachan
Lycée Gustave Flaubert, Rouen
Lycée Gustave Monod, Enghien-les-Bains
Lycée Guy de Maupassant, Fécamp
Lycée Guy Mollet, Arras
Lycée Haute Follis, Laval
Lycée Hector Berlioz, Vincennes
Lycée Hélène Boucher, Paris
Lycée Hélène Boucher, Thionville
Lycée Henri Avril, Lamballe
Lycée Henri Bergson, Angers
Lycée Henri Bergson, Paris
Lycée Henri Brisson, Vierzon
Lycée Henri Cornat, Valognes
Lycée Henri Darras, Liévin
Lycée Henri-IV, Paris
Lycée Henri Iv, Béziers
Lycée Henri Loritz, Nancy
Lycée Henri Martin, Saint Quentin
Lycée Henri Matisse, Cugnaux
Lycée Henri Meck, Molsheim
Lycée Henri Moissan, Meaux
Lycée Henri Nominé, Sarreguemines
Lycée Henri Parriat, Montceau-les-Mines
Lycée Henri Poincaré, Nancy
Lycée Henri Vincenot, Louhans
Lycée Henri Vogt, Commercy
Lycée Henri Wallon (Valenciennes)
Lycée Henri Wallon (Aubervilliers)
Lycée Hilaire de Chardonnet, Chalon-sur-Saône
Lycée Hippolyte Fontaine, Dijon
Lycée Hoche, Versailles
Lycée Honoré D'Urfé, Saint-Étienne
Lycée Honoré Daumier, Marseille
Lycée Honoré de Balzac, Mitry-Mory
Lycée Hugues Capet, Senlis
Lycée Ile de France, Rennes
Lycée Industriel et Commercial Privé, Tourcoing
Lycée Institution Saint-Malo, Saint-Malo
Lycée International, Ferney-Voltaire
Lycée International de Paris Honoré de Balzac, Paris
Lycée International des Pontonniers, Strasbourg
Lycée Ismaël Dauphin, Cavaillon
Lycée J Amyot, Melun
Lycée J Desfontaines, Melle
Lycée Jacques Amyot, Auxerre
Lycée Jacques Audiberti, Antibes
Lycée Jacques Brel, Vénissieux
Lycée Jacques Brel, La Courneuve
Lycée Jacques Callot, Vandœuvre-lès-Nancy
Lycée Jacques Cartier, Saint-Malo
Lycée Jacques Coeur, Bourges
Lycée Jacques Decour, Paris
Lycée Jacques Duhamel, Dole
Lycée Jacques Feyder, Épinay-sur-Seine
Lycée Jacques Marquette, Pont-à-Mousson
Lycée Jacques Monod, Clamart
Lycée Jacques Monod, Saint-Jean-de-Braye
Lycée Jacques Prévert, Taverny
Lycée Jacques Prévert, Pont-Audemer
Lycée Jacques Prévert, Longjumeau
Lycée Jacques Prévert, Boulogne-Billancourt
Lycée Jacques Prévert, Savenay
Lycée Janson de Sailly, Paris
Lycée Jaufré Rudel, Blaye
Lycée Jean Aicard, Hyères
Lycée Jean-Baptiste Colbert, Thionville
Lycée Jean-Baptiste Corot, Douai
Lycée Jean Baptiste de Baudre, Agen
Lycée Jean-Baptiste Dumas, Ales
Lycée Jean-Baptiste Poquelin, Saint-Germain-en-Laye
Lycée Jean Bart, Dunkirk
Lycée Jean Calvin, Noyon
Lycée Jean Dautet, La Rochelle
Lycée Jean de La Fontaine, Château-Thierry
Lycée Jean de La Fontaine, Paris
Lycée Jean de Pange, Sarreguemines
Lycée Jean de Prades, Castelsarrasin
Lycée Jean Durand, Castelnaudary
Lycée Jean Favard, Guéret
Lycée Jean Giraudoux, Châteauroux
Lycée Jean Guehenno, Fougères
Lycée Jean Guéhenno, Flers
Lycée Jean Hippolyte, Jonzac
Lycée Jean Jacques Rousseau, Montmorency
Lycée Jean Jaurès (Montreuil, Seine-Saint-Denis)
Lycée Jean Jaurès (Reims)
Lycée Jean Jaurès (Argenteuil)
Lycée Jean Jaurès (Châtenay-Malabry)
Lycée Jean Joseph Fourier, Auxerre
Lycée Jean Lurçat, Perpignan
Lycée Jean Lurçat, Martigues
Lycée Jean Lurçat, Paris
Lycée Jean Mace, Rennes
Lycée Jean Macé, Vitry-sur-Seine
Lycée Jean Macé, Niort
Lycée Jean Michel, Lons-le-Saunier
Lycée Jean Monnet, Cognac
Lycée Jean Monnet, La Queue-les-Yvelines
Lycée Jean Monnet, Strasbourg
Lycée Jean Monnet, Franconville
Lycée Jean Monnet, Crépy-en-Valois
Lycée Jean Monnet, Montpellier
Lycée Jean Monnet, Vitrolles
Lycée Jean Monnet, Joué-lès-Tours
Lycée Jean Moulin (Béziers)
Lycée Jean Moulin (Draguignan)
Lycée Jean Moulin (Forbach)
Lycée Jean Moulin (Thouars)
Lycée Jean Moulin (Albertville)
Lycée Jean Moulin (Torcy, Seine-et-Marne)
Lycée Jean Moulin (Saint-Amand-Montrond)
Lycée Jean Moulin (Roubaix)
Lycée Jean Moulin (Lyon)
Lycée Jean Moulin (Langon, Gironde)
Lycée Jean Moulin (Pézenas)
Lycée Jean-Paul Sartre, Bron
Lycée Jean Perrin, Marseille
Lycée Jean Perrin, Lambersart
Lycée Jean Perrin, Rezé
Lycée Jean Perrin, Lyon
Lycée Jean Pierre Timbaud, Brétigny-sur-Orge
Lycée Jean Prévost, Montivilliers
Lycée Jean Puy, Roanne
Lycée Jean Racine, Montdidier
Lycée Jean Renoir, Bondy
Lycée Jean Rostand, Chantilly
Lycée Jean Rostand, Caen
Lycée Jean Rostand, Mantes-la-Jolie
Lycée Jean Victor Poncelet, Saint-Avold
Lycée Jean Vilar (Plaisir, Yvelines)
Lycée Jean Vilar (Meaux)
Lycée Jean XXIII, Roubaix
Lycée Jean Zay, Orléans
Lycée Jean Zay, Aulnay-sous-Bois
Lycée Jean Zay, Jarny
LYCÉE Jean-Baptiste Corot, Savigny-sur-Orge
Lycée Jean-Baptiste de La Salle, Lyon
Lycée Jean-Baptiste Say, Paris
Lycée Jean-François Millet, Cherbourg-Octeville
Lycée Jean-Henri Fabre, Carpentras
Lycée Jean-Jacques Rousseau, Sarcelles
Lycée Jeanne D'Arc, Clermont-Ferrand
Lycée Jeanne D'Arc, Rouen
Lycée Jeanne D'Arc, Nancy
Lycée Jeanne D'Arc, Rennes
Lycée Jeanne D'Arc Saint-Ivy, Pontivy
Lycée Jeanne Hachette, Beauvais
Lycée Jehan Ango, Dieppe
Lycée Jehan de Beauce, Chartres
Lycée Jessé de Forest, Avesnes-sur-Helpe
Lycée Joachim du Bellay, Angers
Lycée Joffre, Montpellier
Lycée Joliot Curie, Rennes
Lycée Joliot Curie, Hirson
Lycée Joliot Curie, Dammarie-lès-Lys
Lycée Joliot-Curie, Romilly-sur-Seine
Lycée Joliot-Curie, Sète
Lycée Joseph Loth, Pontivy
Lycée Joseph Marie Carriat, Bourg-en-Bresse
Lycée Joubert, Ancenis
Lycée Jules Ferry, Versailles
Lycée Jules Ferry, Coulommiers
, Saint-Dié-des-Vosges
Lycée Jules-Ferry, Paris
Lycée Jules Ferry, Conflans-Sainte-Honorine
Lycée Jules Fil, Carcassonne
Lycée Jules Haag, Besançon
Lycée Jules Mousseron, Denain
Lycée Jules Renard, Nevers
Lycée Jules Uhry, Creil
Lycée Jules Verne, Nantes
Lycée Julie Daubié, Rombas
Lycée Juliette Récamier, Lyon
Lycée Julliot de La Morandière, Granville
Lycée Kerichen, Brest
Lycée Kerneuzec, Quimperlé
Lycée Kléber, Strasbourg
Lycée l'Assomption, Rennes
Lycée l'Essouriau, Les Ulis
Lycée l'Oiselet, Bourgoin-Jallieu
Lycée la Briquerie, Thionville
Lycée La Bruyère, Versailles
Lycée la Colinière, Nantes
Lycée la Croix Rouge, Brest
Lycée La Fayette, Champagne-sur-Seine
Lycée la Folie Saint-James, Neuilly-sur-Seine
Lycée la Herdrie, Basse-Goulaine
Lycée la Hotoie, Amiens
Lycée La Martinière Duchère, Lyon
Lycée La Martinière Monplaisir, Lyon
Lycée La Martinière Terreaux, Lyon
Lycée La Mennais, Ploërmel
Lycée La Pléiade, Pont-de-Chéruy
Lycée la Providence, Amiens
Lycée La Versoie, Thonon-les-Bains
Lycée Lacassagne, Lyon
Lycée Laetitia Bonaparte, Ajaccio
Lycée Lakanal, Sceaux
Lycée Lalande, Bourg-en-Bresse
Lycée Lamarck, Albert
Lycée Lamartine, Belley
Lycée Lamartine, Mâcon
Lycée Lamartine, Paris
Lycée Langevin Wallon, Champigny-sur-Marne
Lycée Laure Gatet, Périgueux
Lycée Lavoisier, Auchel
Lycée Lavoisier, Paris
Lycée Lazare Carnot, Arras
Lycée Le Castel, Dijon
Lycée Le Corbusier (Poissy)
Lycée Le Corbusier (Aubervilliers)
Lycée Le Grand Chênois, Montbéliard
Lycée Le Likes, Quimper
Lycée Le Mans Sud, Le Mans
Lycée Le Sacré Coeur, Angers
Lycée Le Verrier, Saint-Lô
Lycée Léon Blum (Anc Lycée du Lac), Créteil
Lycée Léon Blum Site Jean Jaurès, Le Creusot
Lycée Léon Bourgeois, Épernay
Lycée Léonard de Vinci, Amboise
Lycée Léonard de Vinci, Villefontaine
Lycée Léonard de Vinci, Melun
Lycée Léonard de Vinci, Saint-Michel-sur-Orge
Lycée Léonard Limosin, Limoges
Lycée Léonce Vieljeux, La Rochelle
Lycée Les Arcades, Dijon
Lycée Les Bruyères, Sotteville-lès-Rouen
Lycée Les Catalins, Montélimar
Lycée Les Eyrieux, Bagnols-sur-Cèze
Lycée Les Fontenelles, Louviers
Lycée Les Lombards, Troyes
Lycée Lesven, Brest
Lycée Libergier, Reims
Lycée Livet, Nantes
Lycée Louis Aragon, Givors
Lycée Louis Armand, Poitiers
Lycée Louis Armand, Villefranche-sur-Saône
Lycée Louis Armand, Paris
Lycée Louis Armand, Chambéry
Lycée Louis Armand, Mulhouse
Lycée Louis Audouin Dubreuil, Saint-Jean-d'Angély
Lycée Louis Barthou, Pau
Lycée Louis Bascan, Rambouillet
Lycée Louis Bertrand, Briey
Lycée Louis Blaringhem, Bethune
Lycée Louis Davier, Joigny
Lycée Louis de Foix, Bayonne
Lycée Louis Feuillade, Lunel
Lycée Louis Jouvet, Taverny
Lycée Louis Lapicque, Épinal
Lycée Louis Le Grand, Paris
Lycée Louis Liard, Falaise
Lycée Louis Majorelle, Toul
Lycée Louis Pasteur (Somain), Somain
Lycée Louis Pasteur (Hénin-Beaumont), Hénin-Beaumont
Lycée Pasteur, Neuilly-sur-Seine
Lycée Louis Pasteur (Strasbourg), Strasbourg
Lycée Louis Pergaud, Besançon
Lycée Louis Thuillier, Amiens
Lycée Louis Vincent, Metz
Lycée Louise Michel, Grenoble
Lycée Louise Michel, Gisors
Lycée Louise Michel, Champigny-sur-Marne
Lycée Louise Michel, Bobigny
Lycée Lumière, Lyon
Lycée Madame de Staël, Montluçon
Lycée Madeleine Michelis, Amiens
Lycée Maine de Biran, Bergerac
Lycée Malherbe, Caen
Lycée Mangin, Sarrebourg
Lycée Mansart, Saint-Cyr-l'École
Lycée Marceau, Chartres
Lycée Marcel Gambier, Lisieux
Lycée Marcel Gimond, Aubenas
Lycée Marcel Pagnol, Marseille
Lycée Marcel Pagnol, Athis-Mons
Lycée Marcel Sembat, Sotteville-lès-Rouen
Lycée Marcelin Berthelot, Saint-Maur-des-Fossés
Lycée Marcelin Berthelot, Châtellerault
Lycée Marcelin Berthelot, Toulouse
Lycée Marcelin Berthelot, Pantin
Lycée Marguerite de Flandre, Gondecourt
Lycée Marguerite de Navarre, Bourges
Lycée Marguerite de Navarre, Alençon
Lycée Marguerite de Valois, Angoulême
Lycée Marguerite Yourcenar, Beuvry
Lycée Margueritte, Verdun
Lycée Margueritte Yourcenar, Le Mans
Lycée Marie Curie, Versailles
Lycée Marie Curie, Tarbes
Lycée Marie Curie, Nogent-sur-Oise
Lycée Marie Curie, Sceaux
Lycée Marie Curie, Marseille
Lycée Marie Curie, Échirolles
Lycée Marie Curie, Strasbourg
Lycée Marie de Champagne, Troyes
Lycée Marie Laurencin, Mennecy
Lycée Marie Madeleine Fourcade, Gardanne
Lycée Mariette, Boulogne-sur-Mer
Lycée Marseilleveyre, Marseille
Lycée Mas de Tesse, Montpellier
Lycée Massena, Nice
Lycée Maurice Genevoix, Marignane
Lycée Maurice Genevoix, Bressuire
Lycée Maurice Genevoix, Ingré
Lycée Maurice Ravel, Paris
Lycée Max Linder, Libourne
Lycée Maxence Van Der Meersch, Roubaix
Lycée Maximilien Sorre, Cachan
Lycée Mermoz, Montpellier
Lycée Mézeray, Argentan
Lycée Michel Anguier, Eu
Lycée Michel de Montaigne, Mulhouse
Lycée Michel Montaigne, Bordeaux
Lycée Michelet, Vanves
Lycée Michelet, Montauban
Lycée Michelet, Marseille
Lycée Militaire, Aix-en-Provence
Lycée Militaire D'Autun, Autun
Lycée Mireille Grenet, Compiègne
Lycée Molière, Paris
Lycée Monge, Chambéry
Lycée Monge, Charleville-Mézières
Lycée Mont Blanc René Dayve, Passy
Lycée Montaigne, Paris
Lycée Montaury, Nîmes
Lycée Montchapet, Dijon
Lycée Montesquieu, Le Mans
Lycée Montesquieu, Bordeaux
Lycée Montesquieu, Herblay
Lycée Montgrand, Marseille
Lycée Montmajour, Arles
Lycée Murat, Issoire
Lycée Napoléon, L'Aigle
Lycée Nevers, Montpellier
Lycée Newton Enrea, Clichy
Lycée Nicephore Niepce, Chalon-sur-Saône
Lycée Nicolas Brémontier, Bordeaux
Lycée Notre-Dame, Guingamp
Lycée Notre-Dame, Le Mans
Lycée Notre-Dame, Fontenay-le-Comte
Lycée Notre-Dame, Dijon
Lycée Notre-Dame, Valenciennes
Lycée Notre-Dame, Boulogne-Billancourt
Lycée Notre-Dame - Saint Sigisbert, Nancy
Lycée Notre-Dame D'Annay, Lille
Lycée Notre-Dame D'Espérance, Saint-Nazaire
Lycée Notre-Dame de Bury, Margency
Lycée Notre-Dame de Grâce, Maubeuge
Lycée Notre-Dame de la Merci, Montpellier
Lycée Notre-Dame de la Paix, Ploemeur
Lycée Notre-Dame de la Paix, Lille
Lycée Notre-Dame des Dunes, Dunkirk
Lycée Notre-Dame des Oiseaux, Verneuil-sur-Seine
Lycée Notre-Dame du Bon Secours, Perpignan
Lycée Notre-Dame du Grandchamp, Versailles
Lycée Notre-Dame du Roc, La Roche-sur-Yon
Lycée Odilon Redon, Pauillac
Lycée Oehmichen, Châlons-en-Champagne
Lycée Olympe de Gouges, Noisy-le-Sec
Lycée Ozanam, Lille
Lycée Pierre-Simon de Laplace, Caen
Lycée P&M Curie Saint Lô, Saint-Lô
Lycée P. Bayen, Châlons-en-Champagne
Lycée Pablo Néruda, Saint-Martin-d'Hères
Lycée Pablo Néruda, Dieppe
Lycée Pablo Picasso, Fontenay-sous-Bois
Lycée Pablo Picasso, Avion
Lycée Pape Clément, Pessac
Lycée Parc Chabrières, Oullins
Lycée Parc des Loges, Évry
Lycée Pasteur (Besançon), Besançon
Lycée Paul Bert, Paris
Lycée Paul Cézanne, Aix-en-Provence
Lycée Paul Claudel, Laon
Lycée Paul Doumer, Le Perreux-sur-Marne
Lycée Paul Duez, Cambrai
Lycée Paul Éluard, Saint-Denis
Lycée Paul Guérin, Niort
Lycée Paul Hazard, Armentières
Lycée Paul Héroult, Saint-Jean-de-Maurienne
Lycée Paul Langevin, Martigues
Lycée Paul Langevin, Suresnes
Lycée Paul Langevin, Beauvais
Lycée Paul Lapie, Courbevoie
Lycée Paul Painlevé, Oyonnax
Lycée Paul Sabatier, Carcassonne
Lycée Paul Valéry, Paris
Lycée Paul Valéry, Sète
Lycée Paul-Louis Courier, Tours
Lycée Philibert Dessaignes, Blois
Lycée Philippe de Girard, Avignon
Lycée Pierre Bayle, Sedan
Lycée Pierre Bourdan, Guéret
Lycée Pierre Brossolette, Villeurbanne
Lycée Pierre Corneille, La Celle-Saint-Cloud
Lycée Pierre D'Ailly, Compiègne
Lycée Pierre D'Aragon, Muret
Lycée Pierre de Coubertin, Calais
Lycée Pierre de Coubertin, Meaux
Lycée Pierre-de-Fermat, Toulouse
Lycée Pierre de la Ramée, Saint Quentin
Lycée Pierre et Marie Curie, Châteauroux
Lycée Pierre et Marie Curie, Neufchateau
Lycée Pierre Forest, Maubeuge
Lycée Pierre Mechain, Laon

Lycée Pierre Mendès France (Vitrolles, Bouches-du-Rhône)
Lycée Pierre Mendès France (La Roche-sur-Yon)
Lycée Pierre Mendès France (Péronne, Somme)
Lycée Pierre Mendès France (Épinal)
Lycée Pierre Mendès France (Savigny-le-Temple)
Lycée Pierre Termier, Grenoble
Lycée Polyvalent Augustin Cournot, Gray
Lycée Polyvalent Baudelaire, Cran-Gevrier
Lycée Polyvalent Camille See, Colmar
Lycée Polyvalent Elie Faure, Lormont
Lycée Polyvalent Georges Colomb, Lure
Lycée Polyvalent Georges Leygues, Villeneuve-sur-Lot
Lycée Polyvalent International Victor-Hugo, Colomiers
Lycée Polyvalent Jean Baptiste Vuillaume, Mirecourt
Lycée Polyvalent Jean Mermoz, Saint-Louis
Lycée Polyvalent Jean Rostand, Strasbourg
Lycée Polyvalent Marlioz, Aix-les-Bains
Lycée Polyvalent Nicolas Appert, Orvault
Lycée Polyvalent Pardailhan, Auch
Lycée Polyvalent Philibert Delorme, L'Isle-d'Abeau
Lycée Polyvalent Régional, Sens
Lycée Polyvalent Régional Gaston Crampe, Aire-sur-l'Adour
Lycée Polyvalent Regional Maurice Merleau Ponty, Rochefort
Lycée Polyvalent Régional Pré de Cordy, Sarlat-la-Canéda
Lycée Polyvalent Régional Voillaume, Aulnay-sous-Bois
Lycée Polyvalent Stanislas, Wissembourg
Lycée Polyvalent Xavier Marmier, Pontarlier
Lycée Pontus de Thiard, Chalon-sur-Saône
Lycée Porte de Normandie, Verneuil-sur-Avre
Lycée Porte Océane, Le Havre
Lycée Portes de l'Oisans, Vizille
Lycée Pothier, Orléans
Lycée Privé Carcado Saisseval, Paris
Lycée Privé de l'Assomption, Bordeaux
Lycée Privé Godefroy de Bouillon, Clermont-Ferrand
Lycée Privé Jehanne D'Arc, Tourcoing
Lycée Privé la Sagesse, Valenciennes
Lycée Privé la Sagesse, Cambrai
Lycée Privé Les Feuillants, Poitiers
Lycée Privé Notre-Dame, Chartres
Lycée Privé Notre-Dame du Marais, Fougères
Lycée Privé Polyvalent Saint-Paul, Lens
Lycée Privé Saint Joseph, Le Havre
Lycée Privé Saint-André Notre-Dame, Niort
Lycée Privé Saint-François de Sales, Évreux
Lycée Privé Saint-Joseph, Bressuire
Lycée Privé Sainte-Marie de La Bastide, Bordeaux
Lycée Privé Sainte-Marie de Nevers, Toulouse
Lycée Privé Sainte-Marie des Champs, Toulouse
Lycée Privé Stanislas, Paris
Lycée Professionnel Marie Balavenne, Saint Brieuc
Lycée Professionnel Paul Langevin, Beaucaire
Lycée Public, Loudéac
Lycée Public Beaumont, Redon
Lycée Public Chateaubriand, Rennes
Lycée Rabelais, Chinon
Lycée Rabelais, Saint Brieuc
Lycée Rabelais, Meudon
Lycée Racine, Paris
Lycée Raoul Dautry, Limoges
Lycée Raoul Follereau, Nevers
Lycée Raoul Follereau, Belfort
Lycée Raspail, Paris
Lycée Raymond Naves, Toulouse
Lycée Raymond Poincaré, Bar-le-Duc
Lycée Raymond Queneau, Villeneuve-d'Ascq
Lycée Raynouard, Brignoles
Lycée Réaumur, Laval
Lycée Rémi Belleau, Nogent-le-Rotrou
Lycée René Auffray, Clichy
Lycée René Cassin (Bayonne)
Lycée René Cassin (Arpajon)
Lycée René Cassin (Gonesse)
Lycée René Descartes, Rennes
Lycée René Josué Valin, La Rochelle
Lycée Richelieu, Rueil-Malmaison
Lycée Robert de Luzarches, Amiens
Lycée Robert Doisneau, Corbeil-Essonnes
Lycée Robert Garnier, La Ferté-Bernard
Lycée Robert Schuman, Metz
Lycée Robert Schuman, Le Havre
Lycée Robert Schuman, Haguenau
Lycée Robert Schuman, Colombes
Lycée Robespierre, Arras
Lycée Rodin, Paris
Lycée Romain Rolland (Argenteuil)
Lycée Romain Rolland (Goussainville, Val-d'Oise)
Lycée Romain Rolland (Clamecy, Nièvre)
Lycée Romain-Rolland, Ivry-sur-Seine
Lycée Ronsard, Vendôme
Lycée Roosevelt, Reims
Lycée Rotrou, Dreux
Lycée Rouvière, Toulon
Lycée Sacré Coeur, Saint-Brieuc
Lycée Sadi Carnot, Saumur
Lycée Saint Exupéry, Saint-Dizier
Lycée Saint-Ambroise, Chambéry
Lycée Saint-Aspais, Melun
Lycée Saint-Benigne, Dijon
Lycée Saint-Charles, Marseille
Lycée Saint-Charles, Arras
Lycée Saint-Charles, Athis-Mons
Lycée Saint-Charles, Saint Brieuc
Lycée Saint Cricq, Pau
Lycée Saint-Esprit, Beauvais
Lycée Saint-Exupéry, Mantes-la-Jolie
Lycée Saint-Exupéry, Marseille
Lycée Saint-Exupéry, Créteil
Lycée Saint-Exupéry, Lyon
Lycée Saint-Félix, Nantes
Lycée Saint-Gabriel, Saint-Laurent-sur-Sèvre
Lycée Saint-Genès, Bordeaux
Lycée Saint-Jacques, Hazebrouck
Lycée Saint-Jean, Douai
Lycée Saint-Jean-Baptiste de La Salle, Nantes
Lycée Saint-John-Perse, Pau
Lycée Saint-Joseph, Avignon
Lycée Saint-Joseph, Épinal
Lycée Saint-Joseph, La Roche-sur-Yon
Lycée Saint-Joseph, Dijon
Lycée Saint-Joseph, Rodez
Lycée Saint-Jude, Armentières
Lycée Saint-Just, Lyon
Lycée Saint-Louis, Paris
Lycée Saint-Louis, Lorient
Lycée Saint-Marc, Lyon
Lycée Saint-Martin, Rennes
Lycée Saint-Martin, Angers
Lycée Saint-Michel, Reims
Lycée Saint-Paul, Vannes
Lycée Saint-Paul, Lille
Lycée Saint-Paul Bourdon-Blanc, Orléans
Lycée Saint-Pierre, Brunoy
Lycée Saint-Pierre de La Joliverie, Saint-Sébastien-sur-Loire
Lycée Saint-Rémi, Amiens
Lycée Saint-Rémy, Soissons
Lycée Saint-Sauveur, Redon
Lycée Saint-Sernin, Toulouse
Lycée Saint-Thomas d'Aquin, Oullins
Lycée Saint-Vaast-Saint-Dominique, Béthune
Lycée Saint-Vincent, Senlis
Lycée Saint-Vincent de Paul, Loos
Lycée Saint-Vincent de Paul, Châlons-en-Champagne
Lycée Saint-Vincent La Providence, Rennes
Lycée Sainte-Croix Saint-Euverte, Orléans
Lycée Sainte-Elisabeth, Nancy
Lycée Sainte-Famille, Amiens
Lycée Sainte-Geneviève, Rennes
Lycée Sainte-Marie, Cholet
Lycée Sainte-Marie, Antony
Lycée Sainte-Marie, Meaux
Lycée Sainte-Marie, Caen
Lycée Sainte-Marie Saint-Dominique, Bourges
Lycée Salvador Allende, Hérouville-Saint-Clair
Lycée Savary de Mauleon, Les Sables-d'Olonne
Lycée Scheurer Kestner, Thann
Lycée Sévigné, Tourcoing
Lycée Sévigné, Charleville-Mézières
Lycée Simone Weil, Le Puy-en-Velay
Lycée Simone Weil, Dijon
Lycée Sophie Barat, Châtenay-Malabry
Lycée Sophie Berthelot, Calais
Lycée Sophie Germain, Paris
Lycée Suzanne Valadon, Limoges
Lycée Talensac, Nantes
Lycée Technique, Lorgues
Lycée Technique Charles Bourseul, Douai
Lycée Technique Léonard de Vinci, Soissons
Lycée Technique Privé Saint Nicolas, Paris
Lycée Technique Privé Sainte Ursule, Caen
Lycée Technique Sidoine Apollinaire, Clermont-Ferrand
Lycée Technologique Dhuoda, Nîmes
Lycée Technologique Jean Monnet, Aurillac
Lycée Théodore Aubanel, Avignon
Lycée Théophile Gautier, Tarbes
Lycée Thibaut de Champagne, Provins
Lycée Thierry Maulnier, Nice
Lycée Thiers, Marseille
Lycée Thomas Corneille, Barentin
Lycée Toulouse-Lautrec, Toulouse
Lycée Turgot, Paris
Lycée Turgot, Limoges
Lycée Urbain Mongazon, Angers
Lycée Uruguay France, Avon
Lycée Val de Durance, Pertuis
Lycée Val de Garonne, Marmande
Lycée Val de Seine, Le Grand-Quevilly
Lycée Valentine Labbé, La Madeleine
Lycée Van Dongen, Lagny-sur-Marne
Lycée Van Gogh, Ermont
Lycée Vauban, Dunkirk
Lycée Vaucanson, Grenoble
Lycée Vaugelas, Chambéry
Lycée Vauvenargues, Aix-en-Provence
Lycée Verlaine, Rethel
Lycée Vial, Nantes
Lycée Victor Duruy, Paris
Lycée Victor Duruy, Mont-de-Marsan
Lycée Victor Grignard, Cherbourg-Octeville
Lycée Victor Hugo, Besançon
Lycée Victor Hugo, Caen
Lycée Victor Hugo, Carpentras
Lycée Victor Hugo, Hennebont
Lycée Victor Hugo, Marseille
Lycée Victor Hugo, Paris
Lycée Victor Hugo, Poitiers
Lycée Victor Louis (Anc Lycée de Talence), Talence
Lycée Viette, Montbéliard
Lycée Villars, Valenciennes
Lycée Vincent d'Indy, Privas
Lycée Vincent van Gogh, Aubergenville
Lycée Voltaire, Paris
Lycée Voltaire, Wingles
Lycée Watteau, Valenciennes
Lycée Yves Kernanec, Marcq-en-Barœul

Schools
Schools
France

Schools
France